Baulin is a Russian masculine surname, its feminine counterpart is Baulina. Notable people with the surname include:

Yuri Baulin (1933–2006), Soviet ice hockey player 

Russian-language surnames